Harbin Ferris Wheel is a  tall giant Ferris wheel in Harbin amusement park, Harbin, Heilongjiang, China.

At the time of its construction in 2003, at a cost 20 million yuan (2.42 million US dollars), it was the tallest Ferris wheel in China and the sixth tallest in the world. It has 63 passenger gondolas, each able to carry 6 passengers. A complete rotation takes 20 minutes and offers panoramic views of the entire city.

References

Buildings and structures in Harbin
Ferris wheels in China
Tourist attractions in Harbin